How to Eat Fried Worms is a children's book written by Thomas Rockwell, first published in 1973. The novel's plot involves a boy eating worms as part of a bet. It has been the frequent target of censors and appears on the American Library Association's list of most commonly challenged books in the United States of 1990-2000 at number 96. It was later turned into a CBS Storybreak episode in the mid-1980s, and a movie of the same name in 2006.

The story continues in two sequels: How to Fight a Girl and How to Get Fabulously Rich.

Plot summary
Billy Forrester accepts a bet from his rival Alan Phelps to eat one worm per day for 15 days, with $50 at stake for the winner. He uses condiments such as ketchup, mustard, and horseradish to disguise the taste of the worms, and his friend Tom Grout assists by frying them to make them more appetizing. Alan and his friend Joe O'Hara try a variety of tactics to keep Billy from eating each day's worm, to no avail. Billy's parents eventually learn about the bet, but decide to support him and even help by preparing some of the worms. On the last day of the bet, Billy discovers that Alan and Joe have given him a fake worm made of beans. They lock him in a closet and plan to lower him into a water cistern so that he cannot win, but Billy's father sends them home and orders Billy to go to his room before he can eat a worm he has found. Tom's younger brother brings him another one, which he eats in view of Alan and Joe to win the bet.

Billy buys a minibike with his winnings, while Alan begins working at a store to earn back the $50 he lost. Billy meets Tom and Joe for lunch in the woods and reveals, to his chagrin, that he has actually started to enjoy eating worms and cannot stop.

References

1973 American novels
American children's novels
American novels adapted into films
CBS Storybreak
1973 children's books
Mark Twain Awards